KXMT (99.1 MHz) is a commercial FM radio station broadcasting a Spanish language Contemporary Hits radio format. Licensed to Taos, New Mexico, the station is currently owned by L.M.N.O.C. Broadcasting LLC.

References

External links
 

Mass media in Taos, New Mexico
Radio stations established in 2005
XMT
XMT
2005 establishments in New Mexico